Jacques Eric Fabre-Jeune, C.S., known before May 2022 as Jacques Fabre, (born November 13, 1955) is a Haitian-American prelate of the Catholic Church who has served as Bishop of Charleston since 2022. 

Fabre-Jeune is the first African American and the first member of a religious community to be named Bishop of Charleston. He is the second Haitian-American bishop and the first to head a diocese. Since becoming a priest with the Scalabrinians in 1986, Fabre-Jeunehas worked in Florida and Georgia, the Dominican Republic, and briefly at a refugee camp at Guantanamo Bay Naval Base, Cuba.

Biography

Early life 
Jacques Fabre-Jeune was born in Port-au-Prince, Haiti, on 13 November 1955; he had five siblings. He emigrated to the United States as a teenager and completed high school in New York City. He attended St. John's University in Jamaica, New York, and then Saint Michael's College in Toronto, Canada. Fabre-Jeune also studied at the Catholic Theological Union in Hyde Park, Illinois, and at the Scalabrini House of Theology in Chicago. He received a Master of Divinity degree and a Licentiate in Migration Studies from the Pontifical Urbaniana University in Rome. As a Scalabrini novice, Fabre-Jeune worked at one of their missions in Mexico.

Priesthood 
On October 10, 1986, Fabre-Jeune was ordained a priest of the Scalabrini in the Diocese of Brooklyn by then Auxiliary Bishop Wilton D. Gregory. Fabre-Jeune's assignments have included

 Parochial vicar at Our Lady of Guadalupe Parish in Immokalee, Florida, from 1986 to 1990
 Chaplain to Haitian refugees in Guantanamo, Cuba in 1990
 Pastor of a parish in San Pedro de Macorís in the Dominican Republic from 1991 to 2004
 Parochial vicar at St. Joseph's Parish in Athens, Georgia, from 2006 to 2008 
 Parochial vicar at Holy Trinity Parish in Peachtree City, Georgia, from 2008 to 2010 
 Administrator at San Felipe de Jesús Mission in Forest Park, Georgia, from June 2008 to 2022. He led the congregation in self-financing the construction of a new church, dedicated in April 2011.

From 2010 to 2022, Fabre-Jeuneserved the Archdiocese of Atlanta as a member of its finance council, its budget and operations committee, its projects review committee, and as director of the Hispanic Charismatic Renewal. He also became the head of Scalabrini fathers in Atlanta.

Bishop of Charleston 
Pope Francis appointed Fabre-Jeune as bishop for the Diocese of Charleston on February 22, 2022. He is the first African-American man named to the position and the first member of a religious order. Fabre-Jeune was consecrated a bishop by Cardinal Wilton Gregory and installed in Charleston on May 13, 2022.

He is fluent in English, Spanish, Italian, French, and Creole. He has called English his "third language".

Notes

See also

 Catholic Church hierarchy
 Catholic Church in the United States
 Historical list of the Catholic bishops of the United States
 List of Catholic bishops of the United States
 Lists of patriarchs, archbishops, and bishops

References

External links
 
 

  
 

1955 births
Living people
Scalabrinians
Bishops appointed by Pope Francis 
Pontifical Urban University alumni
Haitian emigrants to the United States
Haitian Roman Catholic bishops
Haitian Roman Catholic missionaries
People from Port-au-Prince